Collapsed Lung are an English, Harlow-based Britpop group, best known for the song "Eat My Goal". They formed in February 1992.

History
Collapsed Lung was originally formed as a bedroom studio collaboration between Anthony Chapman and Steve Harcourt.  The pair had met at Harlow music venue The Square, and despite coming from contrasting musical backgrounds (Harcourt had previously played guitar in metal band Bomberz, whereas Chapman had previously played bass in pseudo-C86 outfit Pregnant Neck) found they had a shared love of funk and the Amiga tracker software Med/Octamed.  Eventually, the duo decided to perform a live show, using an Amiga computer on stage as well as live guitar from Harcourt.

After their debut performance they were invited to play an all-day music festival in Harlow at which Harcourt first met Nihal Arthanayake, a school friend of Chapman. Nihal was a rapper of Sri Lankan descent who was studying law in Twickenham, Middlesex. He was consequently invited to record some of his raps over the duo's existing tracks. Chapman later took up co-rapping duties alongside Arthanayake, with the line-up completed by bass player Johnny Dawe (previously of Hull band Death By Milkfloat). However, Arthanayake left the band in 1994 after signing a deal for his own group Muddie Funksters with Go! Discs.

Collapsed Lung replaced him with rapper Jim Burke and drummer Chris Gutch. Chapman also bolstered his reputation with DJ work at a variety of London venues. He was keen to reinstate Collapsed Lung's rap credentials, stating "at the end of the day, it's just hip-hop", while promoting the release of 1995's Jackpot Goalie.  In late 1995, drummer Chris Gutch left the group to join a band called Rehab. Gutch was replaced by Jerry Hawkins, previously of Atom Seed and The Fuzz.

In 1996 they released their second album Cooler (written as C**ler – the type on the album artwork reflecting the use of stars to denote the refrigeration level of a domestic freezer). In June 1996 a double A-side "London Tonight" / "Eat My Goal" was released which reached number 31 in the UK Singles Chart.  "Eat My Goal" was used as the soundtrack to Coca-Cola's "Eat Football, Sleep Football, Drink Coca-Cola" advertising campaign that tied in with the Euro 96 football championships in England.

Despite their success, Collapsed Lung broke up in 1997.

"Eat My Goal" was re-released in May 1998 and reached number 18 on the same chart, and was subsequently used on many TV programmes, most notably SMTV Live in which the song was used for a segment of the same name. It also featured in the video game LMA Manager 2001.

They reformed again in 2014 to support Senser on 26 June at the Dome in London, and have since been playing shows around the UK, including gigs with Jesus Jones.

"Eat My Goal" continues to be used extensively on TV and radio, including as the theme music for Mark Steel's BBC Radio 4 series Mark Steel's in Town – 2009 to present.

Members

Discography

Albums

EPs

Singles

Compilations

References

Notes 
1.A remix of "Eat My Goal", with the word "eat" changed to "beat".

External links
Entry at Forgotten Band Planet

English hip hop groups
Musical groups established in 1992
Musical groups disestablished in 1996
Musical groups from Essex
Britpop groups
Rap rock groups